Domo, Inc. is an American cloud software company based in American Fork, Utah, United States. It specializes in business intelligence tools and data visualization.

History

Domo, Inc. was founded by Josh James in 2010.
In October 2010, after leaving Adobe, James started Shacho, Inc. In December 2010, Shacho purchased Lindon-based Corda Technologies. James changed Shacho's name to Domo.

In March 2021, Domo was named on the Women Tech Council (WTC) 2020 Shatter List for the fourth consecutive year for hiring and retaining women in IT careers.

Investors 
Initial investors in Domo include Benchmark Capital, Andreessen Horowitz, Ron Conway and David Lee of SV Angel, Hummer Winblad, salesforce.com’s Marc Benioff, and Fraser Bullock of Sorenson Capital. In 2011, $20 million came from Silicon Valley-based Institutional Venture Partners, which also invested in Josh James’ previous start-up, Omniture. In 2013, the company announced a Series B investment of $60 million from GGV Capital, Greylock, Bezos Expeditions, and Co-CEOs of Workday, Aneel Bhusri and Dave Duffield.

In February 2014, Domo announced Series C funding of an additional $125 million from multiple investors including TPG Growth, T. Rowe Price, and Viking Global Investors. Existing investors GGV Capital, Greylock Partners, IVP, and Mercato Partners also participated.

In April 2015, Domo, Inc raised another $200 million in Series D financing with a $2 billion valuation. The round was led by BlackRock and Glynn Capital Management, Capital Group and existing investor GGV also participated. In March 2016, the company closed a Series D investment round of $131 million with its existing investors and new investors, including Credit Suisse and Capital Advisors.

On April 27, 2017, Domo raised $200 million in Series D funding led by Blackrock, with participation from Capital Group, Glynn Capital Management, and GGV Capital. Domo, Inc. was listed on the NASDAQ Global Exchange June 29, 2018, with an initial offering of 9,200,000 shares at $21.00 per share.

Overview

Domo, Inc is a cloud-based platform designed to provide direct, simplified, real-time access to business data for decision makers across the company with minimal IT involvement. It is a Software-as-a-Service (SaaS) venture.

References

Software companies based in Utah
Business software companies
2010 establishments in Utah
Business intelligence companies
Software companies established in 2010
Data companies
Companies based in Utah County, Utah
Data visualization software
Extract, transform, load tools
Business software
Companies listed on the Nasdaq
2018 initial public offerings
American Fork, Utah
Software companies of the United States